Alfred Sauer (July 31, 1880 – November 11, 1943) was an American fencer. US Fencing Hall of Famer Sauer was the US national champion in foil in 1916. He was the US national champion in Épée in 1913. He was also a member of the 1912 US Olympic fencing team. He competed in three events at the 1912 Summer Olympics.

References

External links
 

1880 births
1943 deaths
American male épée fencers
Olympic fencers of the United States
Fencers at the 1912 Summer Olympics
Sportspeople from Würzburg
German emigrants to the United States